Baraband (also Romanized as Bārāband; also known as Bahrāband, Barāvand, and Bārband) is a village in Gonbad Rural District, in the Central District of Hamadan County, Hamadan Province, Iran. At the 2006 census, its population was 259, in 62 families.

References 

Populated places in Hamadan County